Ghost Dog: The Way of the Samurai is a role-playing game published by Guardians of Order in 2000.

Description
Ghost Dog: The Way of the Samurai is based on the film Ghost Dog: The Way of the Samurai, and uses the Tri-Stat System.

Publication history
Ghost Dog: The Way of the Samurai was published by Guardians of Order in 2000.

David L. Pulver and John R. Phythyon, Jr., designed the gangster Samurai Tri-stat game Ghost Dog (2000) based on the film of the same name.

Reception

Reviews
Pyramid
Backstab #24

References

BESM/dX
Canadian role-playing games
Guardians of Order games
Japan in non-Japanese culture
Role-playing games based on films
Role-playing games introduced in 2000